Vladimir Konstantinovich Prokofiev (1898–1993) USSR scientist, PhD, specialist in Optics and Spectroscopy, USSR State Prize winner.

Vladimir Prokofiev graduated Mikhailovsky Artillery School in 1917 and Saint Petersburg State University in 1924. He was a student of Russian academician Dmirtiy Rozhdestvenskiy.

From 1919 up to 1956 he had been working in State Optics Institute. He was an assistant up to 1932, when he got Researcher position and Head of the Spectroscopy Sector position. In 1935 he became the Head of Spectral Analysis Laboratory.

At the same time Vladimir Prokofiev read lectures in Saint Petersburg State University (1925-1932), Academy of Artillery (1930-1937) and in LITMO. In LITMO he was the Head of Spectroscopy Department (1951-1953) and the Head of the Optics and Spectroscopy Department (1953-1956).

Vladimir Prokofiev earned PhD degree at 1936 and became professor at 1944.

He moved to Crimea in 1956 to improve his health and employed in Crimean Astrophysical Observatory.

Vladimir Prokofiev was awarded degree of Honored master of sciences and engineering in 1958. USSR State Prize winner (1950, 1971). Member of International Academy of Astronautics (1974). Also awarded Order of Lenin, Order of the October Revolution, Order of the Red Star. Four times was awarded Order of the Red Banner of Labour.

References

External links
  // Personal Page at ITMO 
  // To the Anniversary of great Scientis

1898 births
1993 deaths
Recipients of the USSR State Prize
Recipients of the Order of Honour (Russia)
Academic staff of ITMO University
Russian astrophysicists
Spectroscopists
Academic staff of Saint Petersburg State University